Nardana railway station is located near Nardana town of Dhule district, Maharashtra. Its code is NDN. It has three platforms. Passenger and Express trains halt here.

Trains

The following trains halt at Nardana railway station in both directions:

 19025/26 Surat–Amravati Express
 19003/04 Khandesh Express

References 

Railway stations in Dhule district
Mumbai WR railway division